Daniel Flynn (4 November 1884 – 1980) was a British cyclist. He competed in four events at the 1908 Summer Olympics.

References

External links
 

1884 births
1980 deaths
British male cyclists
Olympic cyclists of Great Britain
Cyclists at the 1908 Summer Olympics
Cyclists from Glasgow
20th-century British people